The Diplomatic mission of Ukraine to the European Union is the diplomatic mission of Ukraine to the European Union and European Atomic Energy Community; it is based in Brussels, Belgium.

History
Diplomatic relations between the EU and Ukraine were established in December 1991. Next year Ukraine designated its first representative to the EU - Ambassador Volodymyr Vasylenko.

The fully-fledged Mission of Ukraine to the European Union was established in Brussels in 1996.

Heads of the Mission

Volodymyr Vasylenko (1996–1998), Ukrainian diplomat. Ambassador Extraordinary and Plenipotentiary of Ukraine;

Ihor MITYUKOV (1996–1998), former Deputy Prime-Minister of Ukraine;

Boris HUDYMA (1998–2000), career diplomat, former Deputy Minister of Foreign Affairs responsible for the relations with the European Union institutions;

Roman SHPEK (2000–2008), former Deputy Prime Minister and Head of the National Agency for Development and European integration;

Andri VESELOVSKY (2008–May 2010), career diplomat, former Deputy Minister of Foreign Affairs responsible for the relations with the European Union institutions;

Kostiantyn YELISIEIEV (July 2010-July 2015), career diplomat, former Deputy Minister of Foreign Affairs responsible for the relations with the European Union institutions;

Mykola Tochytskyi (2016–), Ukrainian diplomat. Ambassador Extraordinary and Plenipotentiary of Ukraine to the Kingdom of Belgium and to the Grand Duchy of Luxembourg.

Comparison

See also
 Ukraine–European Union relations
 Mykola Tochytskyi
 Foreign relations of Ukraine

References

EU
Ukraine
Ukraine–European Union relations